Tajik passports (Toçik Şinosnoma) are issued to citizens of the Republic of Tajikistan to enable them to travel outside the country. It is the international proof of identity of any Tajik citizen.

Biometric passport
On February 1, 2010, biometric passports were introduced in Tajikistan. Approximately 100,000 blank biometric passports, including 20,000 blank diplomatic biometric passports, 20,000 blank service biometric passports and 60,000 blank ordinary biometric passports were printed. The chip and antenna are not easily visually recognisable, but their presence is indicated using the ICAO biometric passport symbol at the bottom of the front cover.

Validity
The ordinary Tajik biometric passport is issued to Tajik citizens for 10 years, while the diplomatic and service biometric passports are issued for 5 years for international travel.

Types

There are three types of Tajik passports:

Ordinary
Issuable to all citizens of the Republic of Tajikistan for international travel.

Service
Issued to individual citizens who work for the government, in order to travel for state business.

Diplomatic
Issuable to all diplomats of Republic of Tajikistan overseas as well as to their family members.

Passport cover
Pre-biometric Tajik passport covers are blue with the words Republic of Tajikistan inscribed on top of the booklet in Tajik language and also inscribed in English at the bottom. The Tajik coat of arms is emblazoned in the center of the cover page, followed on the bottom by the inscription of the word "PASSPORT" in Tajik and English.

Visa requirements

See also
Republic of Tajikistan
Foreign relations of Tajikistan
List of passports

References

External links

Tajikistan
Law of Tajikistan
Passport